Austin Amer (born February 17, 2000) is an American soccer player who plays as a midfielder.

Career

Youth 
A native of Tampa, Florida, Amer played for the Orlando City Development Academy during the 2015–16 season. In 2017 he moved to play for the Barça Residency Academy based at Grande Sports World in Casa Grande, Arizona. He emerged as one of the program's best midfielders in the inaugural year and returned to play for the U19 team the following season, electing to take a gap year while still considering whether to play college soccer or turn pro.

Orlando City B 
In March 2019, Amer signed his first professional contract with USL League One side Orlando City B. In doing so he became the first Barça Residency Academy player to sign professionally. He spent two seasons with the team, making 33 appearances, before being released in October 2020.

Sportfreunde Lotte 
On July 20, 2021, Amer signed with German semi-professional side Sportfreunde Lotte in the fourth-tier Regionalliga West.

Career statistics

Club

References

External links 
 
 Austin Amer at Orlando City B

2000 births
Living people
American soccer players
Association football midfielders
Orlando City B players
Reading United A.C. players
Sportfreunde Lotte players
Soccer players from Tampa, Florida
USL League One players
USL League Two players
Regionalliga players
American expatriate soccer players
American expatriate soccer players in Germany